Remington Stables is a historic stable building located at Ilion in Herkimer County, New York. It is a large 2-story brick structure built about 1870 as part of the Remington Mansion complex. The mansion was demolished about 1930.  It consists of three connecting masses: a 2-story, square central block; a 3-story, engaged tower; and a -story rear wing. When built, the tower had a pagoda roof, but it was removed in the 1930s.  The stable building has been adapted for use as a theater and used by the Ilion Little Theatre Club.

It was listed on the National Register of Historic Places in 1976.

References

External links
Welcome to the Ilion Little Theatre - Ilion, NY

Barns on the National Register of Historic Places in New York (state)
Transport infrastructure completed in 1870
Buildings and structures in Herkimer County, New York
National Register of Historic Places in Herkimer County, New York